This is a list of alternative rock artists. Bands are listed alphabetically by the first letter in their name (not including "The"), and individuals are listed by the first name.

0–9

+44
3 Doors Down 
3OH!3
4 Non Blondes
7 Year Bitch
8stops7
10 Years
12 Stones
13 Engines
54-40
The 77s
311
The 1975
10,000 Maniacs

A

A Day to Remember
A Perfect Circle
A Rocket to the Moon
A Silent Film
Aaroh
Acceptance
The Accidentals
The Aces
Adam Again
Adam Gontier
Adorable
The Afghan Whigs
AFI
After Midnight Project
Against Me!
Against the Current
Age of Chance
Air
The Airborne Toxic Event
Alanis Morissette
The Alarm
Alex Clare
Alex Chilton
Alice in Chains
Alien Ant Farm
Alkaline Trio
The All-American Rejects
All Time Low
The Almost
Alpha Rev
Alt-J
Alvvays
The American Analog Set
American Authors
American Hi-Fi
American Standards
Amplifier
The Amps
Anathema
Anberlin
Andy Biersack
Angels & Airwaves
APB
The Apples in Stereo
Arcade Fire
Arcane Roots
Architecture in Helsinki
Arctic Monkeys
Area 11
Arkells
As Tall As Lions
Ash
Asian Kung-Fu Generation
The Asteroids Galaxy Tour
At the Drive-In
The Ataris
Athlete
Atlas Genius
Atom Smash
Audioslave
The Auteurs
Autolux
Avril Lavigne
Awolnation

B

B-52s
Babes in Toyland
Bad Books
Bad Suns
Badflower
The Badgeman
Balance and Composure
Band of Horses
Barenaked Ladies
Baryonyx
Bastille
Battles
Bayside
Be Your Own Pet
Beady Eye
Beastie Boys
Beck
Beirut
The Belltower
Belly
Ben Folds Five
Ben Kweller
Benjamin Burnley
Beth Orton
Better Than Ezra
Beware of Darkness
Biffy Clyro
Big Black
Big Dipper
The Big Pink
Billie Joe Armstrong
Billy Corgan
Billy Talent
The Birds of Satan
Birds of Tokyo
Björk
The Black Crowes
The Black Keys
Black Kids
Black Light Burns
Black Rebel Motorcycle Club
Bleachers
Blind Melon
Blind Pilot
Blink-182
Bloc Party
Blonde Redhead
Blood Red Shoes
Bloodhound Gang
Blue October
The Bluebells 
Blumfeld
Blur
Bob Mould
Bodyjar
The Bolshoi
Bon Iver 
Bono
The Boo Radleys
Bowling For Soup
Boys Like Girls
Bracket
Brand New
Brandon Flowers
The Bravery
Breaking Benjamin
The Breeders
Brendon Urie
Bring Me the Horizon
Broder Daniel
Brother Cane
The Buck Pets
Buffalo Tom
Bully
Bush
Butthole Surfers

C

The Cab
Caesars
Cage the Elephant
Cake
The Calling
Camper Van Beethoven
Candlebox
Candy Flip
Canterbury
The Cardigans
Caribou
Carolina Liar
Carter the Unstoppable Sex Machine
Cast
The Cat Empire
Cat Power
Catatonia
Catherine
Catherine Wheel
Caveman
Cell
Chad Kroeger
The Charlatans
Charlie Simpson
Cherri Bomb
Chester Bennington
Chevelle
The Chills
Chimera
Chris Cornell
Chris Martin
Chumbawamba
The Church
Chvrches
The Cinematics
Circa Survive
Circus Diablo
Citizen Cope
Citizen King
Civil Twilight
Clap Your Hands Say Yeah
The Classic Crime
Cloud Control
Cloud Nothings
The Clouds
Cobra Starship
Coheed and Cambria
Cold War Kids
Coldplay
Coldrain
Collective Soul
The Colourist
Company of Thieves
Concrete Blonde
The Connells
The Constellations
Copeland
The Coral Sea
Courtney Love
The Cramps
The Cranberries
Crash Test Dummies
The Creatures
Creed
The Cribs
Croc Shop
Crooked Fingers
Crowded House
Crystal Antlers
Crystal Castles
The Cult
Cults
The Cure
Curve
Cute Is What We Aim For
Cymbals Eat Guitars

D

Daisy Chainsaw
The Damned
The Damning Well
Dan Auerbach
Dan Reynolds
The Dandy Warhols
The Dangerous Summer
Daniel Amos
The Darling Buds
Das Damen
Dashboard Confessional
The Datsuns
Daughtry
Dave Gahan
Dave Grohl
Dave Matthews Band
Davey Havok
Days of the New
The dB's
Deacon Blue
Dead by Sunrise
Dead Letter Circus
The Dead Milkmen
Dead Sara
The Dead Weather
The Deadly Syndrome
Deaf Havana
The Dear Hunter
Deas Vail
Death Cab for Cutie
The Decemberists
Deep Blue Something
Deerhunter
Deftones
The Del Fuegos
The Delgados
Depeche Mode
Deryck Whibley
Di-rect
Die Kreuzen
DIIV
Dinosaur Jr.
The Dirty Heads
Dirty Projectors
Dispatch
Dishwalla
The Dodos
The Donnas
Doves
Dr. Dog
The Dream Academy
Dredg
The Drums
Dum Dum Girls
Duran Duran

E

Eddie Vedder
Editors
Edwyn Collins
Eels
Elastica
Elbow
Eleanor Friedberger
Electrasy
Electronic
Eleventh Dream Day
Elvis Costello
Emiliana Torrini
Emily Haines & the Soft Skeleton
Enter Shikari
Envy on the Coast
Eraserheads
Evanescence
Evans Blue
Everclear
Every Avenue
The Exies
The Explosion
Explosions in the Sky

F

Failure
Faith No More
The Fall
Fall Out Boy
Falling in Reverse
Fastball
Fatboy Slim
Fatherson
The Fatima Mansions
Fearless Vampire Killers
Feeder
The Feelies
Feist
The Fiery Furnaces
Fightstar
Filter
Fine Young Cannibals
Finch
Finger Eleven
Fiona Apple
Fishbone
Fitz and the Tantrums
Five For Fighting
The Flaming Lips
Fleet Foxes
Flight of the Conchords
Flobots
Flor
Florence and the Machine
Flow
Flyleaf
Foals
Folk Implosion
Foo Fighters
Fool's Garden
For Against
Forever The Sickest Kids
The Format
Foster the People
Fountains of Wayne
The Frames
Framing Hanley
Frank Black and the Catholics
Frank Iero
Frank Turner
Franz Ferdinand
The Fratellis
The Fray
Freelance Whales
Frente!
Fuel
Fugazi
Fun
Fun Lovin Criminals
Funeral For A Friend
Funeral Party
The Futureheads

G

The Gandharvas
Gang Gang Dance
Garbage
Garrett Borns
Gary Lightbody
The Gaslight Anthem
Gerard Way
The Get Up Kids
Giant Drag
Gin Blossoms
Girl in a Coma
Givers
Glasvegas
Gnarls Barkley
Go Radio
The Go-Betweens
The God Machine
God Lives Underwater
Godsmack
Godspeed You! Black Emperor
Golden Palominos
The Golden Seals
Gomez
Goo Goo Dolls
Good Charlotte
The Good, the Bad & the Queen
Goodbye Mr Mackenzie
Goon Moon
Gorillaz
Gotye
Graham Coxon
Grandaddy
grandson
Grant Lee Buffalo
Gravity Kills
Greek Fire
Green Day
Green on Red
Green River
Grimes
Grinderman
Grizzly Bear
Grouplove
Guided by Voices
Gumball
Guster

H

Halestorm
HalfNoise
Handsome Furs
Hawthorne Heights
Hayden
Hayley Williams
The Head and the Heart
Headstones
Heather Nova
Heatmiser
The Heavy
Helium
Hellogoodbye
Her's
Hideto Matsumoto
Highly Suspect
Hinder
His Name Is Alive
The Hives
Hoax
Hockey
The Hold Steady
Hole
The Hollow Men
Holly McNarland
Hello Sleepwalkers
Hoobastank
Hoodoo Gurus
Hootie and The Blowfish
Horse Feathers
Hot Hot Heat
Hot Snakes
The House of Love
The Housemartins
Howlin Maggie
Hozier
Hum
Human Drama
Hundred Reasons
Hunter Valentine
Hunters and Collectors
Hurricane No. 1
Hurts
Hüsker Dü
Hypnolovewheel

I

I Hate Kate
I Love You but I've Chosen Darkness
I Mother Earth
iamamiwhoami
IAMX
Ian Brown
Icicle Works
Icon For Hire
Ida Maria
Ideamen
Idlewild
I Dont Know How But They Found Me
Imagine Dragons 
Imogen Heap
Incubus
The Innocence Mission
Inspiral Carpets
Institute
Interpol
Into Another
The Invisible
INXS
Iron & Wine
Isaac Slade
Islands
Ivoryline

J

Jack Off Jill
Jack White
Jack's Mannequin
Jaguares
James
James Blunt
James Bourne
James Iha
James "The Rev" Sullivan
Jamie N Commons
Jane's Addiction
Janus Stark
Jars of Clay
Jarvis Cocker
Jason Loewenstein
Jawbox
Jeff Buckley
Jerry Cantrell
Jersey Budd
The Jesus and Mary Chain
Jesus Jones
The Jesus Lizard
Jet
Jill Sobule
Jimmie's Chicken Shack
Jimmy Chamberlin Complex
Jimmy Eat World
Jitters
Joan Jett
Joanna Newsom
John Butler Trio
John Frusciante
Johnny Marr
Joon Wolfsberg
Jonathan Davis
Jon Spencer Blues Explosion
Josh Dun
Joywave
The Joy Formidable
Judah and the Lion
Judybats
Julian Casablancas
Julian Cope
Juliana Hatfield
The Juliana Hatfield Three
The Juliana Theory
Julien-K
Juliette and the Licks
July Talk
Jxdn

K

K's Choice
Kaiser Chiefs
Kaizers Orchestra
Kaleo
Kane
Kara's Flowers
Kasabian
Keane
KennyHoopla
Kent
Kevin Devine
Kill Hannah
Killdozer
The Killers
Killing Joke
The Kills
Kimbra
King Charles
King Missile
Kings of Convenience
Kings of Leon
Kirsty MacColl
Kitchens of Distinction
Kiwi Time
Klaxons
KMFDM
Knifeworld
Knuckle Puck
Kodaline
Kongos
The Kooks
Korn
KT Tunstall
Kula Shaker
Kurt Cobain
Kutless

L

L7
The La's
Lacey Sturm
LaFee
The LaFontaines
LANY
L'Arc-en-Ciel
Larrikin Love
Last Child
Last Dinosaurs
The Last Shadow Puppets
Lawson
LCD Soundsystem
The Lemonheads
Less Than Jake
Let's Active
Letters to Cleo
The Levellers
Liars
The Libertines
The Life and Times
Lifehouse
Lightning Seeds
LIGHTS
Lilys
Lil Peep
The Lilac Time
Limblifter
The Limousines
Limp Bizkit
Linkin Park
Lit
Live
The Living Things
Liz Phair
Lloyd Cole
Lo-Pro
Local H
Local Natives
Lodger
Loop
LostAlone
Lostprophets
Lou Barlow
Lou Reed
LOUDspeakers
Louis XIV
Lovehammers
Lovelytheband
Love Among Freaks
Love and Rockets
Love Battery
Love Spit Love
Low
Lower Than Atlantis
Lucero
The Lucid
The Lumineers
Luna
Luscious Jackson
Lush
Lyapis Trubetskoy
Lynda Thomas

M

M83
Mad Season
The Madden Brothers
Madina Lake
Madrugada
Magic Dirt
Magnapop
The Maine
Makethisrelate
Mallory Knox
Man or Astro-man?
Manchester Orchestra
Mando Diao
Manic Street Preachers
Mansun
Manu Chao
Marching Band
Marco Restrepo
Marcy Playground
Marianas Trench
Marilyn Manson
Marina and the Diamonds
Mark Hoppus
Martha and The Muffins
The Mars Volta
Mary's Danish
Massive Attack
Matchbox Twenty
Material Issue
Matt and Kim
Matt Willis
Matthew Good
Matthew Good Band 
Matthew Sweet
Maxïmo Park
Mayday
Mayday Parade
Mazzy Star
McLusky
Meat Puppets
Medicine
Meg Myers
The Mekons
Melanie Martinez
Melissa Auf der Maur
Melvins
Mercury Rev
MGMT
Michael Poulsen
Michael Stipe
Middle Class Rut
Midnight Oil
The Mighty Lemon Drops
The Mighty Mighty Bosstones
Mike Shinoda
Miles Kane
Milky Chance
The Mills
Mindless Self Indulgence
Ministry
Minutemen
Miracle Legion
Missio
The Mission
Mobile
Moby
Mod Fun
Mod Sun
Modern Baseball
Modern English
Modest Mouse
Mogwai
Moist
Moloko
Monaco
Mono Puff
Monoral
Moonbabies
Moose
Morcheeba
Morning Parade
Morningwood
Morphine
Morrissey
Mor ve Ötesi
Mother Love Bone
Mother Mother
Motion City Soundtrack
The Mountain Goats
The Mowgli's
Mr Hudson
Mudhoney
Mumford & Sons
Muse
The Music
Music for Dead Birds
Mutemath
Muzzle
My Bloody Valentine
My Chemical Romance
My Darkest Days
My Morning Jacket
My Sister's Machine
Myles Kennedy

N

Nada Surf
The Naked and Famous
Name Taken
Natalie Merchant
The National
National Velvet
Navarone
The Nearly Deads
Ned's Atomic Dustbin
Needtobreathe
The Neighbourhood
Neon Horse
Neon Indian
Neon Trees
Nerf Herder
Neu Electrikk
Neutral Milk Hotel
Netral
New Empire
New Found Glory
New Model Army
New Order
New Politics
The New Pornographers
New Radicals
Nic Nassuet
Nick Cave and the Bad Seeds
Nickelback
Nico Vega
Night Verses
Nightmare and the Cat
Nine Black Alps
Nine Inch Nails
Nine Lashes
Nirvana
No Devotion
No Doubt
NOAH
Noel Gallagher's High Flying Birds
Noir Désir
Nothing But Thieves
Nude
The Nymphs

O

O.A.R.
Oasis
The Ocean Blue
Ocean Colour Scene
Oceansize
Odds
The Offspring
 Of Mice & Men
Of Monsters and Men
Of Montreal
Oingo Boingo
OK Go
Okkervil River
Oleander
Olenka and the Autumn Lovers
Oliver Sykes
Oliver Tree
One Ok Rock
OneRepublic
The Operation M.D.
Orgy
Ostava
Our Lady Peace
Our Last Night
The Owl Service
Ozma

P

P.O.D.
Pale Saints
Panic! at the Disco
Papa Roach
Parabelle
Paramore
Passion Pit
The Pastels
Patrick Monahan
Patrick Stump
Patti Smith
Paul Westerberg
Paul Weller
Pavement
Pearl Jam
Pedro the Lion
Pere Ubu
Pete Wentz
Peter Bjorn and John
Peter Kember (aka Sonic Boom/Spectrum)
Peter Murphy
Phantogram
Phantom Planet
Phoenix
Pierce the Veil
Pierre Bouvier
Pillar
The Pillows
Pinback
Pixies
PJ Harvey
Placebo
Plain White T's
Plimsouls
Pluto
Poe
Poets of the Fall
The Pogues
Polvo
The Polyphonic Spree
Pond
Poor Old Lu
Pop Evil
Pop Will Eat Itself
Porcupine Tree
Porno for Pyros
Portishead
Portugal. The Man
The Posies
Possum Dixon
The Postal Service
Poster Children
Powerman 5000
The Presidents of the United States of America
The Pretenders
The Pretty Reckless
Primal Scream
Primitive Radio Gods
The Primitives
Primus
The Proclaimers
The Prodigy
The Psychedelic Furs
Public Image Ltd.
Puddle of Mudd
Pulled Apart By Horses
Pulp
Pupil
Pussy Galore
PVRIS
Pylon

Q

Queens of the Stone Age
Quicksand
Quietdrive

R

R.E.M.
Ra Ra Riot
The Raconteurs
Radiohead
The Radio Dept.
Radio Iodine 
Radwimps 
Rage Against the Machine
The Railway Children
Rain Parade
Ramones
Rapeman
Ratatat
The Raveonettes
Ray Toro
Razorlight
The Ready Set
Recovery Child
Red Hot Chili Peppers
Red House Painters
The Red Jumpsuit Apparatus
Redd Kross
Reef
The Refreshments
Regina Spektor
Relient K
Remy Zero
The Rentals
Renegade Soundwave
The Replacements
Republica
Residual Kid
Revenge
Revolverheld
Rhythm Corps
Richard Ashcroft
Richard Hawley
Ride
Rivers Cuomo
Robert "Throb" Young
Robyn Hitchcock
Rocket from the Crypt
The Rockfords
Rooney
Roselia
Roses Are Red
Royal Bliss
Royal Blood
Royal Republic
Royal Trux
The Rubens
Run River North
Rusty Willoughby
Ryn Weaver

S 

SafetySuit
Sahara Hotnights
Said the Whale
Saint Asonia
Saint Etienne
Saint Motel
Saliva
Salt 
Sam Roberts
Sambomaster
Sammy
Saosin
Sara Craig
Save Ferris
Saving Abel
Say Anything
Scanners
Scarling.
Scars on Broadway 
SCH
School of Fish
The Score
Scott Stapp
Scott Weiland
Screaming Jets
Screaming Trees
The Script
Seaweed
Sebadoh
Secondhand Serenade
Seether
Self
Semisonic
The Servants
Seven Mary Three
The Shamen
Shawn Mullins
She Wants Revenge
Shearwater
Shed Seven
Sheila on 7
Shellac
Shihad
Shinedown
The Shins
Shiny Toy Guns
Shipping News
Short Stack
Shout Out Louds
Shudder to Think
Sia
Sick Puppies
Sigur Rós
Silver Jews
Silverchair
Silverstein
Silversun Pickups
Simple Kid
Simple Minds
Simple Plan
Sinéad Lohan
Sinéad O'Connor
Siouxsie and the Banshees
Sister Hazel
The Sisters of Mercy
Six Finger Satellite
Sixpence None the Richer
Sixteen Deluxe
Skillet
Skindred
Skin Yard
Skunk Anansie
Skye Sweetnam
Sleater-Kinney
Sleeper
Sleeper Agent
Sleeping with Sirens
Sleigh Bells
Sleep Room
Slint
Sloan
Slowdive
Smash Mouth
The Smashing Pumpkins
Smith Westerns
The Smithereens
The Smiths
Smoking Popes
Snail Mail
Snot
Snow Patrol
Snowcake
Soccer Mommy
Social Code
Social Distortion
Soda Stereo
Some Velvet Sidewalk
Something Corporate
Son of Dork
Sonic Youth
Sons of Day
Sons of Elvis
Sorry About Your Daughter
Sort Sol
Soul Asylum
Soul Coughing
Sound Team
Soundgarden
The Sounds
Soup Dragons
South Cry
Spacehog
Spacemen 3
Sparta
Spear of Destiny
Spin Doctors
Spirit of the West
Spiritualized
Splendora
Sponge
Sponge Cola
Spoon
Spoons
Squeeze
Squirrel Nut Zippers
St. Vincent
Stabbing Westward
Staind
Starflyer 59
The Starlings
Stars
Starsailor
Starset
State Radio
Stellar West
Stereolab
Stereophonics
Steve Adey
Steve Burns
Steve Taylor
Steve Taylor & The Perfect Foil
The Stone Roses
Stone Sour
Stone Temple Pilots
Story Of The Year
The Stranglers
The Strokes
The Subways
Suede
Sugar
Sugar Ray
The Sugarcubes
Sugarcult
Sullen
Sum 41
Sunday Driver
The Sundays 
Sunny Day Real Estate
Sunrise Avenue
Super Furry Animals
Supercar
Superchick
Superchunk
Superdrag
Supergrass
Superheaven
The Superjesus
Surrounded
Suzanne Vega
Swans
Sweet Water
Sweethead
Swervedriver 
Switchfoot
SWMRS
System of a Down

T

TAD
Takida
Taking Back Sunday
Talk Talk
Talk Show
Tally Hall
Tame Impala
Tapes 'n Tapes
Tappi Tíkarrass
Taproot
Taylor Momsen
The Tea Party
Team Sleep
The Tears
Teenage Fanclub
Tegan and Sara
The Telescopes
Temple of the Dog
Terrible Things
Test Icicles
Texas
Th' Faith Healers
That Dog
The The
The Academy Is...
Therapy?
There For Tomorrow
They Might Be Giants
Thin White Rope
Thinking Fellers Union Local 282
Third Day
Third Eye Blind
Thirteen Senses
Thirty Seconds to Mars
This Century
This Picture
Thom Yorke
Thousand Foot Krutch
Three Days Grace
Three Fish
The Three O'Clock
Thrice
Throwing Muses
Tiffany Alvord
Tiger Please
Tim McIlrath
Tinfed
TISM
Toad the Wet Sprocket
Toadies
Tokio Hotel
Tokyo Police Club
Tomahawk
Tom DeLonge
Tom Fletcher
Tom Morello
Tom Waits
Tonic
Tonight Alive
Tool
Too Much Joy
Tori Amos
Tracy Bonham
Tragically Hip
Train
Transvision Vamp
Trapt
Trashcan Sinatras
Travis
Trent Reznor
The Trews
Tripping Daisy
Troy Baker
Tse Tse Fly
TTNG
Tuscadero
TV on the Radio
Tweaker
Twenty One Pilots
Twin Atlantic
Two Door Cinema Club
Tyler Joseph
Tyson Ritter

U

U2 
Ubiquitous Synergy Seeker
Ugly Casanova
Ultra Vivid Scene
Uncle Tupelo
Underworld
Under the Influence of Giants
Uniklubi
Unrest
Unsane
Unwritten Law
UPSAHL
Urge Overkill
Us Amongst The Rest
The Used
Uverworld

V

The Vaccines
Vampire Weekend
Vanessa Petruo
The Vaselines
Vast
Veridia
VersaEmerge
Versus
Vertical Horizon
Veruca Salt
The Verve
The Verve Pipe
VHS or Beta
Vib Gyor
Vic Chestnutt
Victoria Williams
The Vines
Violent Femmes
Violent Soho
The Virgins
Volcano Suns
The Von Bondies
Voxtrot

W

Wakey!Wakey!
Walk Off the Earth
Walk the Moon
The Wallflowers
Wallows
Walt Mink
Wannadies
Warpaint
Waterparks
Wavves
Wax on Radio
We Are Scientists
We Are the Ocean
We the Kings
Ween
The Weakerthans
Weathers
The Wedding Present
Weeping Willows
Weezer
Wellwater Conspiracy
Whale
Wheatus
White Lies
The White Stripes
White Town
Wilco
Wild Strawberries
Wintersleep
Wolf Alice
Wolf Parade
The Wolfhounds
The Wombats
The Wonder Stuff
Wooden Shjips
Working for a Nuclear Free City
World Party
WZRD

X

X Ambassadors

Y

Yeah Yeah Yeahs
Yellowcard
Yo La Tengo
You Am I
You Me At Six
Young Guns
Young the Giant
Youngblood Hawke
 Yungblud

Z

Zoé
The Zolas
Zonic Shockum
Zox
The Zutons
Zvuki Mu
Zwan

See also

List of alternative metal artists
List of Britpop musicians
List of dream pop artists
List of gothic rock bands
List of indie pop artists
List of indie rock musicians
List of industrial rock bands
List of math rock groups
List of post-grunge bands
List of post-punk revival bands
List of post-rock bands
List of shoegazing musicians
Lists of musicians

References

 
Lists of rock musicians by subgenre
Lists of musicians by genre
Rock music lists